Alpena School District is a public school district whose facilities are in Boone County, Arkansas, United States which serves most of the city of Alpena along with surrounding unincorporated areas within Boone, Carroll, and Newton counties.

History
In 1980 the Newton County School District dissolved, with a portion going to the Alpena district.

Schools 
 Alpena High School 
 Alpena Elementary School

Alpena High School 
Alpena High School serves seventh through twelfth grades.  Based on the 2009-2010 academic year, the total enrollment in the school was 237 and total full-time teachers was 33.30, with a teacher/student ratio of 7.12.

Alpena Elementary School 
Alpena Elementary School serves preschool through sixth grades.  Based on the 2009-2010 academic year, the total enrollment in the school was 359 and total full-time teachers was 29.70, with a teacher/student ratio of 12.09.

Board of Education 
The Alpena School District Board of Education is composed of five elected members.  Regular meetings are held monthly.

Staffing
Based on the 2009-2010 academic year, the total full-time staff of the Alpena School District was 112.  The total full-time teachers was 63.  The total number of non-teaching staff (including 3 administrators) was 49.

Expenditures
Based on the 2011-2012 Proposed Budget, expected expenditures for 2011-2012 were:

Demographics
Within the geographic area covered by the Alpena School District, there were 715 individuals under the age of 18, during the 2009-2010 academic year.

See also

 List of school districts in Arkansas

References

Further reading
These include maps of predecessor districts:
 (Download)
 (Download)
 (Download)

External links
 
 Alpena School District Board of Education Meeting Minutes
 Alpena School District (National Center for Education Statistics)
 2010 Arkansas Legislative Audit for the Alpena School District

School districts in Arkansas
Education in Boone County, Arkansas
Schools in Boone County, Arkansas
Education in Carroll County, Arkansas
Education in Newton County, Arkansas